Arcola is a comune (municipality) in the Province of La Spezia in the Italian region Liguria, located about  southeast of Genoa and about  northeast of La Spezia.

The municipality of Arcola contains the frazioni (subdivisions, mainly villages and hamlets) Baccano, Termo, Fresonara, Monti, Romito Magra, Cerri, and Trebiano.

Arcola borders the following municipalities: La Spezia, Lerici, Sarzana, Vezzano Ligure.

Demographic evolution

References

External links
 www.comune.arcola.sp.it/

Cities and towns in Liguria
Articles which contain graphical timelines